The belt problem is a mathematics problem which requires finding the length of a crossed belt that connects two circular pulleys with radius r1 and r2 whose centers are separated by a distance P. The solution of the belt problem requires trigonometry and the concepts of the bitangent line, the vertical angle, and congruent angles.

Solution 

Clearly triangles ACO and ADO are congruent right angled triangles, as are triangles BEO and BFO. In addition, triangles ACO and BEO are similar. Therefore angles CAO, DAO, EBO and FBO are all equal.

This exploits the convenience of denominating angles in radians that the length of an arc = the radius × the measure of the angle facing the arc.

To find  we see from the similarity of triangles ACO and BEO that

For fixed P the length of the belt depends only on the sum of the radius values r1 + r2, and not on their individual values.

Pulley problem 

There are other types of problems similar to the belt problem. The pulley problem, as shown, is similar to the belt problem; however, the belt does not cross itself. In the pulley problem the length of the belt is

where r1 represents the radius of the larger pulley, r2 represents the radius of the smaller one, and:

Applications 

The belt problem is used  in the design of aeroplanes, bicycle gearing, cars, and other items with pulleys or belts that cross each other. The pulley problem is also used in the design of conveyor belts found in airport luggage belts and automated factory lines.

See also 
 Tangent lines to circles

References 

Trigonometry